Sonny Sumo is a fictional sumo wrestler, a comic book superhero published by DC Comics. He first appeared briefly in Forever People #4 (September 1971) and was created by Jack Kirby.

Publication history
Sonny Sumo first appeared briefly in Forever People #4 (September 1971) and was reintroduced in the pages of Final Crisis #2 (August 2008).

Fictional character biography
Prior to his encounter with the Forever People, Sonny Sumo was an honorable figure who used his prowess in sumo to compete as an underground fighter. Unbeknownst to Sonny or his manager, Harry Sharp, Sonny contained a portion of the Anti-Life Equation that enhanced his ability to harness his chi. The Forever People were able to unlock the Equation's powers with their Mother Box, allowing him to recover permanently from wounds sustained in an organized battle against a robot called Sagutai. Sonny then joined the team in their battle against Desaad, using his unique abilities to force Darkseid's minions into a deep sleep. This event earned Sonny and his allies the ire of Darkseid himself, who used his Omega Sanction to trap Sonny in feudal Japan.

Final Crisis

In the second issue of Final Crisis, Sonny Sumo is seen living in present day Japan. His role as a fighter has earned him some level of celebrity with the pop-culture driven youths that frequent metahuman nightclubs, including Super Young Team. Shilo Norman discovers Sonny in the club after a battle with an armored youth called Megayakuza, using his Mother Box to heal his wounds. Sonny joins Shilo in his quest to battle the New Gods who have fallen to Earth. They are soon joined by Super Young Team, before joining the remnants of Checkmate. Sonny Sumo eventually revealed that he was not the original Sonny, who had encountered the Forever People of the Fourth World; after having been sent to the past, he remained there and led a fruitful life, eventually dying a happy man. This Sonny was born on the alternate world known as Earth-51, which had been devastated and restored several times; possibly one of these events resulted in his being transported to New Earth.

References

External links
 Comicvine.com: Sonny Sumo Profile
 Article: For Love of Sonny Sumo
 Secret Wars on Infinite Earths: Sonny Sumo Battles#2]

DC Comics martial artists
DC Comics superheroes
Fourth World (comics)
Comics characters introduced in 1971
Fictional sumo wrestlers
Characters created by Jack Kirby